Jean-Charles Blanpin (born 29 October 1989) is a French former footballer.

Career statistics

Club

Notes

References

1989 births
Living people
French footballers
French expatriate footballers
Association football midfielders
Singapore Premier League players
Expatriate footballers in Singapore
French expatriate sportspeople in Singapore
Étoile FC players
People from Nogent-sur-Marne
Footballers from Val-de-Marne